Wangibi popularly known as Ikka Wangibi is a rural  Area occupied by the Eggon people of Nigeria in Nasarawa state. The area is located in the nasarawa eggon local government area of Nasarawa state. The Eggon people are generally predominantly found in Nasarawa towns and villages

Populated places in Nasarawa State